The Joint Training and Training Development Center (JT2DC) is a training facility for the Army National Guard and is operated by the New Jersey Army National Guard. The JT2DC is located in Burlington County, New Jersey.

References

External links

Engagement Skills Trainer (EST)

United States Army posts
New Jersey National Guard
Buildings and structures in Burlington County, New Jersey
New Hanover Township, New Jersey
Pemberton Township, New Jersey
Springfield Township, Burlington County, New Jersey